David or Dave Edgar may refer to:

David Edgar (soccer) (born 1987), Canadian soccer player
David Edgar (playwright) (born 1948), English playwright
David Edgar (swimmer) (born 1950), American swimmer
Dave Edgar (footballer) (1902–1976), Scottish footballer